In Australian Aboriginal mythology (specifically: Kunwinjku), Mamaragan or Namarrkon is a lightning Ancestral Being who speaks with thunder as his voice.  He rides a storm-cloud and throws lightning bolts to humans and trees.  He lives in a puddle.

Characteristics and appearance
Namarrkon is the lightning man.  Namarrkon soaks up the sun's rays, which form bright arcs of light across each of his shoulders.  He is mostly unseen, living high in the sky and riding storm clouds.  He makes thunderous sounds by striking the clouds with stone axes fixed to his head, elbows, and knees.

He appears each year in Kunumeleng, pre-monsoon season, reminding people of the consequences of invoking the spiritual power.  If people disobey the law, Namarrkon hisses, crackles, and even strikes the offender with his fiery spears of lightning.

Actions during ancient climate change 
The climate changed nearly 7,000 years ago, causing the ice caps to melt and sea levels to rise.  During this period, Namarrkon created violent thunderstorms in preparation for the Wet Season rains brought by the Rainbow Serpent.

Dreaming site 
During the dry season, he lives in a billabong not far from Numbuwah, a sacred rock in Western Arnhem Land. Namarrkon's dreaming site (djadjan) is a slight projection in the outline of the Arnhem Land escarpment. It consists of three fused pillars, one with a circular hole near the top. This is a few km NE of the Nourlangie Rock tourist site to the east of Koongarra saddle.  Namarggon left one eye (the hole) to watch for the monsoon, but also to watch his estranged wife, whose home is a cave in a pillar near Koongarra. Namarrkondjadjan is well-named, as the promontory creates the earliest intense lightning storms.

In Aboriginal art 
Namarrkon is depicted in Arnhem land Rock art with the best known depiction being at Nourlangie rock. This spirit was also depicted by numerous aboriginal artists on bark paintings including Lofty Nadjamerrek, Nadjombolmi and Mick Kubarkku. He is depicted with stone axes on his elbows or knees and a lightning surrounding his body. Only certain artists who have the right to this dreaming may paint depictions of this spirit.

In popular culture
In the DC Comics story The Darkseid War the superhero Shazam is empowered by six new deities; one of them is Mamaragan, revealed to be the true identity of the Wizard who originally empowered the hero.

In the Japanese Manga One Piece, Kami Eneru uses an attack called Mamaragan to attempt the destruction of Skypiea.

References

Australian Aboriginal gods
Thunder gods